Mody may refer to:
 Maturity onset diabetes of the young (MODY)
 Hormusjee Naorojee Mody
William Mody, MP